Casein kinase, a type of kinase enzyme, may refer to:

 Casein kinase 1, serine/threonine-selective protein kinase family
 Casein kinase 2, a serine/threonine-selective protein kinase

Protein kinases